John Rochon is a Canadian shooter.

He won 3 bronze and 2 silver for Canada in the 1998 Commonwealth Games. He is the oldest person to represent Canada in the Commonwealth Games, when he was aged 57.

He was awarded the Order of Ontario in 2004.

References

Year of birth missing
Year of death missing
Members of the Order of Ontario
Canadian male sport shooters
Commonwealth Games medallists in shooting
Commonwealth Games silver medallists for Canada
Commonwealth Games bronze medallists for Canada
Shooters at the 1998 Commonwealth Games
Medallists at the 1998 Commonwealth Games